Viking Two, Viking 2, Viking II, or variant, may refer to:

 Viking 2 (1975-1980) NASA space probe to Mars
 Viking II (rocket), a 1949 U.S. NRL sounding rocket mission
 Société Européenne de Propulsion Viking 2 (rocket engine), the first production version of the Viking (rocket engine)
  (since 1976), a passenger ferry called "Viking 2" (1986-1988)
 Empire Viking II, the Empire Ship named "Viking II", see List of Empire ships (U–Z)
 Viking Aircraft Viking II, a powered parachute made by Viking Aircraft, introduced in 2000
 ASJA Viking II, a Swedish 4-seat light airplane
 Vickers Viking II, the name of the second production aircraft of the WW1 amphibious plane Vickers Viking
 Viking FK 2 (aka Viking 2) Stavanger, Norway soccer team
 Vikings (season 2), 2014 TV season of Vikings TV series
 Vikings episode 2 "Wrath of the Northmen", see List of Vikings episodes

See also
 Viking (disambiguation)

Disambiguation pages